The 2022 Korea Open was a badminton tournament that took place at Palma Indoor Stadium in Suncheon, South Korea, from 5–10 April 2022. The tournament had a total prize pool of $360,000.

Tournament
The 2022 Korea Open was the eighth tournament of the 2022 BWF World Tour and was part of the Korea Open championships, which had been held since 1991. This tournament was organized by the Badminton Korea Association with sanction from the BWF.

Venue
This international tournament was held at Palma Indoor Stadium in Suncheon, South Korea. This was the first Korea Open to be held in Suncheon.

Point distribution
Below is the point distribution table for each phase of the tournament based on the BWF points system for the BWF World Tour Super 500 event.

Prize pool
The total prize money was US$360,000 with the distribution of the prize money in accordance with BWF regulations.

Men's singles

Seeds 

 Anthony Sinisuka Ginting (first round)
 Lee Zii Jia (withdrew)
 Jonatan Christie (final)
 Loh Kean Yew (withdrew)
 Srikanth Kidambi (semi-finals)
 Lakshya Sen (second round)
 Rasmus Gemke (withdrew)
 Kunlavut Vitidsarn (quarter-finals)

Finals

Top half

Section 1

Section 2

Bottom half

Section 3

Section 4

Women's singles

Seeds 

 Chen Yufei (second round)
 An Se-young (champion)
 P. V. Sindhu (semi-finals)
 Ratchanok Intanon (quarter-finals)
 He Bingjiao (withdrew)
 Pornpawee Chochuwong (final)
 Busanan Ongbamrungphan (quarter-finals)
 Michelle Li (first round)

Finals

Top half

Section 1

Section 2

Bottom half

Section 3

Section 4

Men's doubles

Seeds 

 Marcus Fernaldi Gideon / Kevin Sanjaya Sukamuljo (withdrew)
 Mohammad Ahsan / Hendra Setiawan (semi-finals)
 Satwiksairaj Rankireddy / Chirag Shetty (quarter-finals)
 Fajar Alfian / Muhammad Rian Ardianto (final)
 Kim Astrup / Anders Skaarup Rasmussen (withdrew)
 Ong Yew Sin / Teo Ee Yi (quarter-finals)
 Ben Lane / Sean Vendy (withdrew)
 Ko Sung-hyun / Shin Baek-cheol (withdrew)

Finals

Top half

Section 1

Section 2

Bottom half

Section 3

Section 4

Women's doubles

Seeds 

 Ashwini Ponnappa / N. Sikki Reddy (quarter-finals)
 Jeong Na-eun / Kim Hye-jeong (champions)

Bracket

Mixed doubles

Seeds 

 Seo Seung-jae / Chae Yoo-jung (withdrew)
 Tan Kian Meng / Lai Pei Jing (champions)
 Goh Soon Huat / Shevon Jemie Lai (second round)
 Ko Sung-hyun / Eom Hye-won (final)
 Ou Xuanyi / Huang Yaqiong (quarter-finals)
 Rinov Rivaldy / Pitha Haningtyas Mentari (semi-finals)
 Adnan Maulana / Mychelle Crhystine Bandaso (quarter-finals)
 Terry Hee / Tan Wei Han (second round)

Finals

Top half

Section 1

Section 2

Bottom half

Section 3

Section 4

References

External links
 Tournament Link

Korea Open (badminton)
Korea Open
Korea Open
Korea Open